Picrosia is a genus of South American plants in the tribe Cichorieae within the family Asteraceae.

 Species
 Picrosia cabreriana A.G.Schulz - Brazil (Paraná, Rio Grande do Sul, Santa Catarina), Paraguay (Amambay), Argentina (Chaco, Corrientes, Misiones)
 Picrosia longifolia D.Don - northern + southern Argentina, Chile (Tarapaca), Paraguay (Alto Paraguay, Central, Presudente Hayes, San Pedro), Uruguay (Montevideo), Peru (Lima), Brazil (Rio Grande do Sul, Santa Catarina)

References

Flora of South America
Cichorieae
Asteraceae genera